The Millennium Project was an initiative that focused on detailing the organizational means, operational priorities, and financing structures necessary to achieve the Millennium Development Goals or (MDGs). The goals are aimed at the reduction of poverty, hunger, disease, illiteracy, environmental degradation, and discrimination against women. At the United Nations Millennium Summit in September 2000 world leaders had initiated the development of the MDGs and had set a completion date for the project of June 2005.

In order to support the MDGs, UN Secretary-General Kofi Annan and Administrator of the UN Development Programme (UNDP) Mark Malloch Brown launched the Millennium Project to determine the best strategies for achieving the MDGs. The Project was headed by Professor Jeffrey Sachs.  The Millennium Project worked from 2002 to 2005 to devise a recommended plan of implementation that would allow all developing countries to meet the MDGs and thereby substantially improve the human condition by 2015.  The Millennium Project presented its final recommendations in its report to the Secretary-General Investing in Development: A Practical Plan to Achieve the Millennium Development Goals, completed in January 2005.

Ten theme-oriented task forces have been created in order to perform the majority of the research. The task forces are an amalgamation of representatives from the academic community, public and private sectors of society, civil society organizations, and UN agencies that also include participants from outside the UN. Each Task Force is composed of 15-20 members who are all international leaders in their specific area, and are selected on the basis of their practical experience and technical expertise.

Eight Goals
1 Eradicate extreme hunger and poverty
2 Achieve universal primary education
3 Promote gender equality and empower women
4 Reduce child mortality
5 Improve maternal health
6 Combat HIV/AIDS, Malaria and other diseases
7 Ensure environmental stability
8 A global partnership for development

See also

Millennium Villages Project
Copenhagen Consensus
 2005 World Summit

References

2^http://www.millennium-project.org/

(reference http://www.unmillenniumproject.org/ is a scam link)

Further reading
 Task Force Reports, United Nations Millennium Project

External links
UN Millennium Project website
Millennium Promise
United Nations Millennium Summit photo
Lil' MDGs - MDGs for Children
Inner City Kids Dream Big with MDGs

Millennium Development Goals